Sandra Ann Rotman, is a Canadian philanthropist and community leader. She and her late husband, Joseph Rotman (O.C., LL.D) frequently directed their philanthropy as a couple to support Canadian institutions in the arts, health and education. Over the course of twenty years, the Rotmans have served on many boards and donated more than $90 million to charities. In 2006, Sandra Rotman was honored with the Order of Ontario, and in 2007 was awarded an honorary LL.D. from the University of Toronto. She married Joseph L. Rotman in 1959; they have two children, Janis and Kenneth. She lives in Toronto, Canada.

Community work 
Sandra Rotman has served on the boards of several Canadian institutions in the arts, health and education:

 Vice Chair - Rotman CAMH Social Enterprise Development / Rise Asset Development 2011–present
 Vice Chair - Ontario Heritage Foundation	1998-2004
 Board of Trustees - University Health Network	1998-2008
 Board of Directors, Art Gallery of Ontario	2004-present
 Sotheby's Canada International Advisory Board	2002-present
 Canadian Friends of the Israel Museum - Honorary Chair	1990-present
 Contemporary Curatorial Committee, Art Gallery of Ontario	1985-2000
 Board of Directors, Toronto International Film Festival	1989-1998
 Board of Directors, National Ballet of Canada	1987-1993

Health and life sciences 
Rotman is a long-standing supporter of health institutions in Canada. The Rotmans supported the Baycrest Centre for Geriatric Care, which researches aging and dementia, in Toronto for close to three decades. In 1989, they established the Rotman Research Institute to study cognitive neuroscience and to translate the most recent research directly to benefit patients. Also at Baycrest, she created the Sandra A. Rotman Program in Neuropsychiatry.

For more than two decades, Sandra Rotman has been a contributor to the University Health Network in downtown Toronto as a board member and a donor. 

Established by both University Health Network and the University of Toronto, the Sandra Rotman Centre focuses on global health through translational research on malaria, through ethics, social and cultural research. The centre hosts Grand Challenges Canada, a federally funded program. The University of Toronto also hosts the Sandra Rotman Chair in Health Sector Strategy and the Rotman School of Management.	

Rotman is an advocate of mental health issues. After being treated for anxiety, she worked with the Rotman School of Management to create  Rise Asset Development in 2009. Rise Asset Development provides free business mentoring and the Centre for Addiction and Mental Health for health supports, providing assistance to entrepreneurs living with mental illness and addictions .

Arts 
Sandra Rotman is a major benefactor to the National Ballet of Canada, the Art Gallery of Ontario, the Canadian Opera Company, the Israel Museum, the Toronto Symphony and the Toronto International Film Festival. She also founded the Louis Applebaum Visitorship in Film Composition at the University Of Toronto School of Music. Both Sandra and Joseph Rotman helped found the Elinor and Lou Siminovitch Prize in Theater [https://siminovitchprize.com/], an annual award where the winning Laureate receives $75,000 and selects an emerging artist to receive a $25,000 Protégé Prize.

Education and honours 
Rotman attended Toronto Teachers College, graduating in 1958. In 1960–61, she studied Fine Arts at Barnard College in New York. She continued her studies at the University of Toronto, receiving her BA in 1975.

In 2006, Rotman was created a member of the Order of Ontario, and in 2007 she was awarded an honorary LL.D. by the University of Toronto.

In advance of the 2010 Vancouver Olympic Games, the Rotmans were selected to be torchbearers for the Vancouver 2010 Olympic Torch Run in Toronto on December 17, 2009.	

The Rotmans received the Outstanding Philanthropists Award from The Association of Fundraising Professionals in 2009.

In 2010, the Rotmans received the Beth Sholom Brotherhood Humanitarian Award.

In 2013, she was made a Member of the Order of Canada "for her leadership in support of health care and the arts, notably as a driver of initiatives in global and mental health".

References

External links
Rotman School of Management
Rotman Research Institute
Art Gallery of Ontario 
Martin Prosperity Institute
University Health Network

Jewish Canadian philanthropists
1938 births
Living people
People from Toronto
Members of the Order of Canada
Members of the Order of Ontario